Saafi Boulbaba (18 March 19863 June 2022) was a Tunisian professional footballer who played as a defender. He died as the result of a traffic accident in the town of Borj El Amri, Tunisia.

References

External links
 DZFoot Profile
 

1986 births
2022 deaths
Tunisian footballers
Association football defenders
Tunisian Ligue Professionnelle 1 players
Algerian Ligue Professionnelle 1 players
Espérance Sportive de Tunis players
AS Marsa players
AS Kasserine players
MC El Eulma players
Tunisian expatriate footballers
Tunisian expatriate sportspeople in Algeria
Expatriate footballers in Algeria
Road incident deaths in Tunisia